The Trojan War is a 1981 board game published by Metagaming Concepts.

Gameplay
The Trojan War is a game of heroic combat on and around the walls of Troy during its famous, eleven year siege.

Reception
Paul O'Connor reviewed The Trojan War in The Space Gamer No. 45. O'Connor commented that "While lacking a bit in color, The Trojan War still provides a reasonably accurate, playable simulation of the battles outside the walls of Troy. If the period interests you, you might want to look this one up. Otherwise, leave The Trojan War on the shelf."

References

Board games introduced in 1981
Metagaming Concepts games